The following radio stations broadcast on FM frequency 92.3 MHz:

Argentina
 AMA in Buenos Aires
 Ciudad in Resistencia, Chaco
 Dale in Campana, Buenos Aires
 Eco Radio in Rosario, Santa Fe
 Educativa in Río Gallegos, Santa Cruz
 Fenix in Ballesteros, Córdoba
 LRI757 FM92 in Roldán, Santa Fe
 Mística in La Plata, Buenos Aires
 Popular in Córdoba
 QSL in Mar del Plata, Buenos Aires
 Radio 10 Bahía Blanca in Bahía Blanca, Buenos Aires
 Radio María in Lomas del Mirador, Buenos Aires
 Radio María in Capilla del Monte, Córdoba
 Radio María in Colón, Entre Ríos

Australia
 2MCE in Bathurst, New South Wales
 2YYY in Young, New South Wales
 ABC Mid North Coast in Grafton, New South Wales
 Vision Radio Network in Emerald, Queensland
 Triple J in Port Lincoln, South Australia
 3ZZZ in Melbourne, Victoria

British Virgin Islands
ZCBN at Tortola

Canada (Channel 222)
 CBAF-FM-5 in Halifax, Nova Scotia
 CBAF-FM-12 in Margaree, Nova Scotia
 CBCT-FM-2 in Elmira, Prince Edward Island
 CBLY-FM in Haliburton, Ontario
 CBMC-FM in Thetford-Mines, Quebec
 CFGI-FM in Georgina Island, Ontario
 CFOX-FM-1 in Whistler, British Columbia
 CFRK-FM in Fredericton, New Brunswick
 CHNT-FM in Notre-Dame-du-Nord, Quebec
 CICQ-FM in Mount Pearl, Newfoundland and Labrador
 CIGP-FM in Radisson, Quebec
 CIHA-FM in Champion, Quebec
 CJAG-FM in Jasper, Alberta
 CJET-FM in Smiths Falls, Ontario
 CJOS-FM in Owen Sound, Ontario
 CKOZ-FM in Corner Brook, Newfoundland and Labrador
 CKWO-FM in Couchiching First Nation, Ontario
 VF2076 in Burgeo, Newfoundland and Labrador
 VF2293 in Rainbow Lake, Alberta
 VF2393 in Estevan, Saskatchewan
 VF2578 in Hazleton, British Columbia
 VF8012 in Gatineau, Quebec
 VF8013 in Ottawa, Ontario
 VF8026 in Quesnel, British Columbia

China 
 Radio Beijing International in Beijing
 CNR The Voice of China in Chaozhou

Indonesia 
 NBS FM in Sukabumi, West Java

Japan
 JOPN-FM
 RKK Radio in Hitoyoshi, Kumamoto

Malaysia
 Ai FM in Labuan
 Minnal FM in Kuala Lumpur

Mexico
 XHBIO-FM in Guadalajara, Jalisco
 XHCAQ-FM in Cancún, Quintana Roo
 XHCCCB-FM in Culiacán, Sinaloa

 XHLY-FM in Morelia, Michoacán
 XHMMF-FM in Mexicali, Baja California
 XHMTE-FM in Ciudad Mante, Tamaulipas
 XHMTO-FM in Matamoros, Tamaulipas
 XHOI-FM in León, Guanajuato
 XHONC-FM in Tuxtla Gutiérrez, Chiapas
 XHPCDC-FM in Ciudad del Carmen, Campeche
 XHPCMQ-FM in Cadereyta de Montes, Querétaro

 XHPSBZ-FM in Sombrerete, Zacatecas

 XHSCIX-FM in Tepoztlán, Morelos
 XHTRR-FM in Torreón, Coahuila
 XHTU-FM in Tuxpan, Veracruz
 XHUSS-FM in Hermosillo, Sonora
 XHZS-FM in Coatzacoalcos, Veracruz

Philippines
 DWFM in Metro Manila, Philippines  
 DYBN in Cebu City
 DXWT in Davao City
 DYYS-FM in Iloilo City
 DWQA in Legazpi City

Saint Lucia
 LIBERTY FM in Soufriere, Saint Lucia

United States (Channel 222)

 KBLU-LP in Logan, Utah
 KBRY in Sargent, Nebraska
  in Olathe, Kansas
 KDPM in Marshall, Texas
 KEHH in Livingston, Texas
  in Omaha, Nebraska
  in Portland, Oregon
 KHRB-LP in Harrisburg, Oregon
  in Killeen, Texas
 KIJN-FM in Farwell, Texas
  in Pine Bluff, Arkansas
  in Victor, Idaho
  in Boise, Idaho
 KKGQ in Newton, Kansas
 KKMT in Ronan, Montana
 KKXI-LP in Mount Pleasant, Texas
 KMOZ-FM in Grand Junction, Colorado
  in Rayville, Louisiana
 KMZE in Woodward, Oklahoma
 KNFM in Midland, Texas
 KNNU in Antlers, Oklahoma
  in New Ulm, Texas
 KOEL-FM in Oelwein, Iowa
 KOFX in El Paso, Texas
 KOMP (FM) in Las Vegas, Nevada
 KQRQ in Rapid City, South Dakota
  in Victoria, Texas
 KRED in Eureka, California
  in Roland, Oklahoma
 KRJF-LP in Santa Rosa, California
  in Kerrville, Texas
 KRRL in Los Angeles, California
  in Albuquerque, New Mexico
  in Thayer, Missouri
  in Sedalia, Missouri
 KSJO in San Jose, California
  in Waipahu, Hawaii
  in Holyoke, Colorado
  in Smith, Nevada
  in Glendale, Arizona
 KTTN-FM in Trenton, Missouri
  in Salida, Colorado
  in Bisbee, Arizona
 KWHJ-LP in Newport, Washington
 KWRZ in Canyonville, Oregon
 KWTB in Alakanuk, Alaska
 KXQX in Tusayan, Arizona
  in Alexandria, Minnesota
 KYOY in Kimball, Nebraska
  in Miles City, Montana
 KZUS in Ephrata, Washington
 WAEG in Evans, Georgia
  in Beulah, Michigan
  in Hialeah, Florida
  in Columbus, Ohio
  in Chattanooga, Tennessee
 WENQ in Grenada, Mississippi
  in Baltimore, Maryland
 WESI-LP in Sugarhill, Georgia
 WFDG-LP in Murrayville, Georgia
  in Troy, New York
 WFWI in Fort Wayne, Indiana
  in Hanover, New Hampshire
 WHHG in Milan, Tennessee
 WHKQ in Louisa, Kentucky
 WHNA in Riverside, Pennsylvania
  in Saint Louis, Missouri
 WINS-FM in New York, New York
  in Clintonville, Wisconsin
  in Ishpeming, Michigan
 WJWY-LP in Wauchula, Florida
  in Cleveland Heights, Ohio
  in Asheboro, North Carolina
 WKTQ (FM) in Oakland, Maryland
  in Montgomery, Alabama
  in Macon, Georgia
  in Augusta, Maine
  in Bostwick, Georgia
 WMXD in Detroit, Michigan
 WOGA in Mansfield, Pennsylvania
  in Spencer, Wisconsin
  in Providence, Rhode Island
  in Hammond, Indiana
  in Meigs, Georgia
  in Jacksonville, North Carolina
 WRLS-FM in Hayward, Wisconsin
  in Warren, Pennsylvania
 WRVU-LP in Grand Rapids, Michigan
 WRWW-LP in Lowell, Michigan
 WSGA (FM) in Hinesville, Georgia
 WSSJ-LP in White Springs, Florida
 WTTS in Trafalgar, Indiana
  in Deltaville, Virginia
  in Orlando, Florida
  in New Martinsville, West Virginia
 WXLK in Roanoke, Virginia
 WXRK-LP in Charlottesville, Virginia
  in London, Kentucky
 WYRC-LP in Spencer, West Virginia
 WZPR in Nags Head, North Carolina
  in Peoria, Illinois
 WZRH in Laplace, Louisiana

References 

Lists of radio stations by frequency